Willow Creek (formerly China Flat) is a census-designated place (CDP) in Humboldt County, California, United States. The population was 1,710 at the 2010 census, down from 1,743 at the 2000 census. Residents of this small mountain town are commonly referred to as "Willow Creekers."

Willow Creek sits along the Trinity River. Willow Creek is described as a "rugged mountain community nestled in the heart of the Six Rivers National Forest." This area of California is located in the Trinity/Shasta/Cascade Region, near the Oregon border, and is easily reached via State Routes 299 and 96 (the "Bigfoot Scenic Byway").

The town is approximately 50 miles south of where the Patterson-Gimlin film was made. The roadhead of the Bluff Creek / Fish Lake Road, near which many alleged Bigfoot sightings and footprint finds occurred, is about 30 miles north, along Route 96.

An Amazon reviewer of the 2013 found-footage horror film, Willow Creek, says, "The endearing quirkiness of the town is captured very well in the iconography, the interviews (particularly with Steven S., the bookstore owner), and the food." The Wikipedia review says, "The two stop off first in Willow Creek ... where various locals talk to Jim's camera, warning them to keep out of the woods, singing ballads about Bigfoot, and generally enjoying their 15 minutes in the spotlight while Jim and Kelly have a blast ...."

Willow Creek was served for many decades by the weekly Klamity Kourier newspaper, which closed in 2006 and was quickly replaced by the Bigfoot Valley News. The Bigfoot Valley News has since closed, but the regional newspaper, Two Rivers Tribune (www.tworiverstribune.com), opened in 1994 and is still going strong. Its news coverage area is from Burnt Ranch to Happy Camp, 97.5 miles (by Routes 299 and 96) to the north.

Geography

Climate
This region experiences much warmer summers than locations near the coast, such as county seat Eureka, but retains high winter rainfall associated with coastal locations. Daytime highs in summer represent areas with hot-summer-Mediterranean climates but are moderated by cool nights, causing high diurnal temperature variation. On climate maps, Willow Creek has a hot-summer Mediterranean climate (Csa). Summer highs are extremely hot compared to areas of the county affected by coastal fog. At the same time, winters are considerably colder, with light snowfall not unusual a few times per season.

History
The indigenous people from here are part of the Tsnungwe or South Fork Hupa and are speakers of the Hupa Language.
Willow Creek's first non-indigenous settlers were Chinese laborers from the mining and lumber camps, which earned the town the name China Flat. The China Flat post office opened in 1878, and changed its name to Willow Creek in 1915.

Demographics

2010
The 2010 United States Census reported that Willow Creek had a population of 1,710. The racial makeup of Willow Creek was 1,375 (80.4%) White, 6 (0.4%) African American, 167 (9.8%) Native American, 14 (0.8%) Asian, 6 (0.4%) Pacific Islander, 29 (1.7%) from other races, and 113 (6.6%) from two or more races. Hispanic or Latino of any race were 108 persons (6.3%).

The Census reported that 1,699 people (99.4% of the population) lived in households, 11 (0.6%) lived in non-institutionalized group quarters, and 0 (0%) were institutionalized.

There were 812 households, out of which 161 (19.8%) had children under the age of 18 living in them, 353 (43.5%) were opposite-sex married couples living together, 63 (7.8%) had a female householder with no husband present, 32 (3.9%) had a male householder with no wife present. There were 75 (9.2%) unmarried opposite-sex partnerships, and 7 (0.9%) same-sex married couples or partnerships. 283 households (34.9%) were made up of individuals, and 94 (11.6%) had someone living alone who was 65 years of age or older. The average household size was 2.09. There were 448 families (55.2% of all households); the average family size was 2.65.

The population was spread out, with 287 people (16.8%) under the age of 18, 100 people (5.8%) aged 18 to 24, 366 people (21.4%) aged 25 to 44, 642 people (37.5%) aged 45 to 64, and 315 people (18.4%) who were 65 years of age or older. The median age was 49.5 years. For every 100 females, there were 101.4 males. For every 100 females age 18 and over, there were 102.1 males.

The homeowner vacancy rate was 1.7%; the rental vacancy rate was 5.2%. 1,087 people (63.6% of the population) lived in owner-occupied housing units and 612 people (35.8%) lived in rental housing units.

2000
As of the census of 2000, there were 1,743 people, 772 households, and 481 families residing in the CDP. The population density was 8.5 people per square mile (3.3/km). There were 1,099 housing units at an average density of 5.4 per square mile (2.1/km). The racial makeup of the CDP was 81.81% White, 0.52% Black or African American, 9.52% Native American, 0.57% Asian, 0.34% Pacific Islander, 1.43% from other races, and 5.79% from two or more races. 5.57% of the population were Hispanic or Latino of any race.

There were 772 households, out of which 24.0% had children under the age of 18 living with them, 49.9% were married couples living together, 8.2% had a female householder with no husband present, and 37.6% were non-families. 31.6% of all households were made up of individuals, and 11.8% had someone living alone who was 65 years of age or older. The average household size was 2.26 and the average family size was 2.81.

In the CDP, the population was spread out, with 22.5% under the age of 18, 5.8% from 18 to 24, 21.8% from 25 to 44, 30.1% from 45 to 64, and 19.9% who were 65 years of age or older. The median age was 45 years. For every 100 females, there were 101.5 males. For every 100 females age 18 and over, there were 104.4 males.

The median income for a household in the CDP was $27,276, and the median income for a family was $35,720. Males had a median income of $33,375 versus $27,955 for females. The per capita income for the CDP was $18,664. About 10.3% of families and 14.4% of the population were below the poverty line, including 19.8% of those under age 18 and 2.3% of those age 65 or over.

Politics

See also

References

1878 establishments in California
Populated places established in 1878
Bigfoot
Census-designated places in Humboldt County, California
Census-designated places in California